The 2nd constituency of the Hautes-Alpes is a French legislative constituency in the Hautes-Alpes department (Provence-Alpes-Côte d'Azur).

It consists of twelve cantons located in the arrondissements of Briançon and Gap: Aiguilles, L'Argentière-la-Bessée, Briançon-Nord, Briançon-Sud, Embrun, La Grave, Guillestre, Le Monêtier-les-Bains, Orcières, Saint-Bonnet-en-Champsaur, Saint-Firmin, Savines-le-Lac

Members elected

Election results

2022

 
 
 
 
|-
| colspan="8" bgcolor="#E9E9E9"|
|-

2017

2012

|- style="background-color:#E9E9E9;text-align:center;"
! colspan="2" rowspan="2" style="text-align:left;" | Candidate
! rowspan="2" colspan="2" style="text-align:left;" | Party
! colspan="2" | 1st round
! colspan="2" | 2nd round
|- style="background-color:#E9E9E9;text-align:center;"
! width="75" | Votes
! width="30" | %
! width="75" | Votes
! width="30" | %
|-
| style="background-color:" |
| style="text-align:left;" | Joël Giraud
| style="text-align:left;" | Radical Party of the Left
| PRG
| 
| 43.00%
| 
| 57.46%
|-
| style="background-color:" |
| style="text-align:left;" | Chantal Eymeoud
| style="text-align:left;" | Union for a Popular Movement
| UMP
| 
| 33.59%
| 
| 42.54%
|-
| style="background-color:" |
| style="text-align:left;" | Sophie Briand
| style="text-align:left;" | National Front
| FN
| 
| 10.06%
| colspan="2" style="text-align:left;" |
|-
| style="background-color:" |
| style="text-align:left;" | Catherine Guigli
| style="text-align:left;" | Left Front
| FG
| 
| 5.39%
| colspan="2" style="text-align:left;" |
|-
| style="background-color:" |
| style="text-align:left;" | Francine Daerden
| style="text-align:left;" | The Greens
| VEC
| 
| 5.36%
| colspan="2" style="text-align:left;" |
|-
| style="background-color:" |
| style="text-align:left;" | Sandrine Faidy
| style="text-align:left;" | Miscellaneous Right
| DVD
| 
| 0.89%
| colspan="2" style="text-align:left;" |
|-
| style="background-color:" |
| style="text-align:left;" | Monique Perrin Czekalski
| style="text-align:left;" | Ecologist
| ECO
| 
| 0.82%
| colspan="2" style="text-align:left;" |
|-
| style="background-color:" |
| style="text-align:left;" | Michel Ben-Haim
| style="text-align:left;" | Other
| AUT
| 
| 0.50%
| colspan="2" style="text-align:left;" |
|-
| style="background-color:" |
| style="text-align:left;" | Véronique Buisson
| style="text-align:left;" | Far Left
| EXG
| 
| 0.41%
| colspan="2" style="text-align:left;" |
|-
| colspan="8" style="background-color:#E9E9E9;"|
|- style="font-weight:bold"
| colspan="4" style="text-align:left;" | Total
| 
| 100%
| 
| 100%
|-
| colspan="8" style="background-color:#E9E9E9;"|
|-
| colspan="4" style="text-align:left;" | Registered voters
| 
| style="background-color:#E9E9E9;"|
| 
| style="background-color:#E9E9E9;"|
|-
| colspan="4" style="text-align:left;" | Blank/Void ballots
| 
| 1.97%
| 
| 3.25%
|-
| colspan="4" style="text-align:left;" | Turnout
| 
| 62.40%
| 
| 61.82%
|-
| colspan="4" style="text-align:left;" | Abstentions
| 
| 37.60%
| 
| 38.18%
|-
| colspan="8" style="background-color:#E9E9E9;"|
|- style="font-weight:bold"
| colspan="6" style="text-align:left;" | Result
| colspan="2" style="background-color:" | PRG HOLD
|}

2007

|- style="background-color:#E9E9E9;text-align:center;"
! colspan="2" rowspan="2" style="text-align:left;" | Candidate
! rowspan="2" colspan="2" style="text-align:left;" | Party
! colspan="2" | 1st round
! colspan="2" | 2nd round
|- style="background-color:#E9E9E9;text-align:center;"
! width="75" | Votes
! width="30" | %
! width="75" | Votes
! width="30" | %
|-
| style="background-color:" |
| style="text-align:left;" | Joël Giraud
| style="text-align:left;" | Radical Party of the Left
| PRG
| 
| 36.84%
| 
| 54.82%
|-
| style="background-color:" |
| style="text-align:left;" | Alain Bayrou
| style="text-align:left;" | Union for a Popular Movement
| UMP
| 
| 34.94%
| 
| 45.18%
|-
| style="background-color:" |
| style="text-align:left;" | Chantal Eymeoud
| style="text-align:left;" | Democratic Movement
| MoDem
| 
| 14.17%
| colspan="2" style="text-align:left;" |
|-
| style="background-color:" |
| style="text-align:left;" | Pierre Leroy
| style="text-align:left;" | The Greens
| VEC
| 
| 4.06%
| colspan="2" style="text-align:left;" |
|-
| style="background-color:" |
| style="text-align:left;" | Michel Louis Pellion
| style="text-align:left;" | National Front
| FN
| 
| 2.18%
| colspan="2" style="text-align:left;" |
|-
| style="background-color:" |
| style="text-align:left;" | Christian Schuller
| style="text-align:left;" | Communist
| COM
| 
| 2.02%
| colspan="2" style="text-align:left;" |
|-
| style="background-color:" |
| style="text-align:left;" | Vincent Chaboy
| style="text-align:left;" | Far Left
| EXG
| 
| 1.69%
| colspan="2" style="text-align:left;" |
|-
| style="background-color:" |
| style="text-align:left;" | André Garcia
| style="text-align:left;" | Hunting, Fishing, Nature, Traditions
| CPNT
| 
| 1.47%
| colspan="2" style="text-align:left;" |
|-
| style="background-color:" |
| style="text-align:left;" | Monique Perrin
| style="text-align:left;" | Divers
| DIV
| 
| 0.77%
| colspan="2" style="text-align:left;" |
|-
| style="background-color:" |
| style="text-align:left;" | Claude Bobin
| style="text-align:left;" | Movement for France
| MPF
| 
| 0.65%
| colspan="2" style="text-align:left;" |
|-
| style="background-color:" |
| style="text-align:left;" | Jacques Gollion
| style="text-align:left;" | Ecologist
| ECO
| 
| 0.49%
| colspan="2" style="text-align:left;" |
|-
| style="background-color:" |
| style="text-align:left;" | Gérard Sauge
| style="text-align:left;" | Far Left
| EXG
| 
| 0.44%
| colspan="2" style="text-align:left;" |
|-
| style="background-color:" |
| style="text-align:left;" | Jean-Pierre Bouteille
| style="text-align:left;" | Far Right
| EXD
| 
| 0.27%
| colspan="2" style="text-align:left;" |
|-
| colspan="8" style="background-color:#E9E9E9;"|
|- style="font-weight:bold"
| colspan="4" style="text-align:left;" | Total
| 
| 100%
| 
| 100%
|-
| colspan="8" style="background-color:#E9E9E9;"|
|-
| colspan="4" style="text-align:left;" | Registered voters
| 
| style="background-color:#E9E9E9;"|
| 
| style="background-color:#E9E9E9;"|
|-
| colspan="4" style="text-align:left;" | Blank/Void ballots
| 
| 1.60%
| 
| 2.66%
|-
| colspan="4" style="text-align:left;" | Turnout
| 
| 67.66%
| 
| 70.25%
|-
| colspan="4" style="text-align:left;" | Abstentions
| 
| 32.34%
| 
| 29.75%
|-
| colspan="8" style="background-color:#E9E9E9;"|
|- style="font-weight:bold"
| colspan="6" style="text-align:left;" | Result
| colspan="2" style="background-color:" | PRG HOLD
|}

2002

 
 
 
 
 
 
|-
| colspan="8" bgcolor="#E9E9E9"|
|-

1997

 
 
 
 
 
 
 
|-
| colspan="8" bgcolor="#E9E9E9"|
|-

Sources
 Notes and portraits of the French MPs under the Fifth Republic, National Assembly of France
 2012 French legislative elections:Hautes-Alpes' 2nd constituency (first round and run-off), Minister of the Interior (France)

References

2
Politics of Provence-Alpes-Côte d'Azur